The Men's +105  kg weightlifting event was the heaviest men's event at the competition, featuring competitors with over 105 kilogrammes of body mass. The competition took place on 31 July at 15:30. The event took place at the Clyde Auditorium.

Result

References

Weightlifting at the 2014 Commonwealth Games